The Livingstone Range is a sub-range of the Canadian Rockies in Alberta, Canada.  It forms the eastern boundary of the Rockies in the south of the province.  Its northern boundary is the Highwood River, and it extends to the Crowsnest Pass in the south. The Livingstone and Oldman Rivers bound it to the west.

History
The range was named after the explorer David Livingstone by Thomas Blakiston, an assistant of John Palliser, in 1858.  When explorer Peter Fidler climbed Thunder Mountain in 1792, he became the first European to make a recorded ascent in the Canadian Rockies.

External links
 current weather
 satellite image
 Weather forecast
 Weather statistics

References

Mountain ranges of Alberta
Ranges of the Canadian Rockies